Charles Thomas (born October 3, 1969) is an American former professional basketball player who played in the National Basketball Association (NBA). He is currently an assistant coach for Duquesne University.

Born in Dayton, Ohio, Thomas played for Everett High School in Lansing, Michigan then played in college for Eastern Michigan University. He played professionally for the Detroit Pistons for the 1991–1992 season.

Charles Thomas also played four seasons in the Australian NBL, two seasons with the Wollongong Hawks, and two with the Adelaide 36ers. Thomas was a part of the 2000/01 championship-winning Wollongong Hawks club, before departing the club at the end of the next season for Adelaide. Charles Thomas is the twin brother of former NBA player Carl Thomas.

Notes

External links
Duquesne Dukes coaching bio
NBA stats at basketball-reference.com

1969 births
Living people
Adelaide 36ers players
African-American basketball players
Akron Zips men's basketball coaches
American expatriate basketball people in Australia
American expatriate basketball people in Sweden
Baltimore Bayrunners players
Basketball players from Michigan
Columbus Horizon players
Connecticut Pride players
Detroit Pistons players
Duquesne Dukes men's basketball coaches
Eastern Michigan Eagles men's basketball players
Fort Wayne Fury players
Grand Rapids Hoops players
Hartford Hellcats players
Radford Highlanders men's basketball coaches
Shooting guards
Basketball players from Dayton, Ohio
Sportspeople from Lansing, Michigan
Undrafted National Basketball Association players
Wollongong Hawks players
American men's basketball players
21st-century African-American people
20th-century African-American sportspeople